Ovington  may refer to:

Places
In England:
 Ovington, County Durham
 Ovington, Essex
 Ovington, Hampshire
 Ovington, Norfolk
 Ovington, Northumberland

People with the surname
 John Ovington (1653–1731), an English priest
 Earle Ovington, American inventor
 Mary White Ovington, American civil rights activist